The 2012–13 season was Ayr United's first season back in the Scottish Second Division, after being relegated from the Scottish First Division at the end of the 2011–12 season after their two legged semi final play-off defeat to Airdrie United. Ayr also competed in the Challenge Cup, League Cup and the Scottish Cup.

Summary

Season
Ayr United finished Seventh in the Scottish Second Division. They reached the first round of the Challenge Cup, the second round of the League Cup and the fourth round of the Scottish Cup.

Management
Ayr will be managed by Mark Roberts for the 2012–13 season, following the departure of Brian Reid whose contract with the club had expired.

Results and fixtures

Pre season

Scottish Second Division

Scottish Challenge Cup

Scottish League Cup

Scottish Cup

Player statistics

Squad statistics
Last updated 12 May 2013

|}

Disciplinary record
Includes all competitive matches.
Last updated 12 May 2013

Team statistics

League table

Division summary

Club

Coaching staff
{|class="wikitable"
|-
!Position
!Staff
|-
|Manager|| Mark Roberts
|-
|Assistant First Team Manager|| David White
|-
|First Team Fitness Coach|| David Johnston
|-
|Groundsman|| David Harkness

Other information

|-

|-

Transfers

Players in

Players out

References

Ayr United F.C. seasons
Ayr United